Charles E. London Secondary School is a former public high school in Richmond, British Columbia. Due to declining enrollment in both schools, London Secondary school and the neighbouring Steveston Secondary School were merged to form Steveston-London Secondary School (SLSS) in 2008, on the site of the former London Secondary.

History
The school was named after Charles Edwin London (1860–1941), a pioneer farmer. It was built on the site of the former London Primary School, which opened in 1965 and closed in 1974 when Maple Lane Elementary School opened.  The site was converted into a junior high school with a grade 8 through 10 curriculum in 1974 and opened on the site in 1975 (for the 1974/5 school year, Charles E. London Secondary School pupils were educated on shift at Hugh Boyd Secondary School). In January 1991, the school was gutted by fire, the cause of which was later ruled to be arson. The school was largely rebuilt, with the gymnasium the only part of the structure that was not damaged (thus earning the nickname "the old gym" after the schools merged in 2007, when the gym was officially named the Legends Gym). In 1995, coinciding with the reopening of the new school, the Richmond School Board amalgamated junior and senior high schools into a single entity. The first graduating class from London was therefore the class of 1997.

In the summer of 1995, the school was used as a filming location, specifically the police station, in Dad's Week Off.

The renovated London Secondary building was chosen to house the new merged school because it was much more modern than Steveston Secondary School's building. A new wing was added to the building to help accommodate the new, larger student population. The former Steveston Secondary building was demolished over the course of mid-2015 to the summer of 2016, replaced by a new residential development.

Historically, the school mascot was a lion, and sports teams were called the "Lords". However, it was changed to "Legends" and the mascot changed to a Pegasus in 1995 because "Lords" was thought to be sexist.

References

External links
 Official school site
 London's Reunion site

School Reports - Ministry of Education
 Class Size
 Satisfaction Survey
 School Performance
 Skills Assessment

High schools in Richmond, British Columbia
Educational institutions disestablished in 2007
2007 disestablishments in British Columbia
Educational institutions established in 1975